The Malagasy Chess Championship is organized by the  (FMJE), which was initially founded in 1970 and most recently revived in 2008 after a decade of inactivity. The national championship was first held in 1994. There is also a separate Malagasy Women's Chess Championship which was first held in 2009.

National championship winners
{| class="sortable wikitable"
! Year !! Champion
|-
| 1994 ||Jean Paul Randrianasolo
|- 
| 1995 ||Jean Loup Foucault
|-
| 1996 ||Jean Loup Foucault
|- 
| 1997 ||Lalanirina Randriantseheno
|-
| 1998 ||Liva Rabenandrasana
|-
| 2008 || 
|-
| 2009 ||Alain Ranaivoharisoa
|-
| 2010 ||Alain Ranaivoharisoa
|-
| 2011 ||Alain Ranaivoharisoa
|-
| 2012 ||Faniry Rajaonarison
|-
| 2013 || Fy Antenaina Rakotomaharo
|-
| 2014 ||Miora Andriamasoandro
|-
| 2015 ||Faniry Rajaonarison
|- 
| 2016 ||Faniry Rajaonarison
|- 
| 2017 ||Faniry Rajaonarison
|- 
| 2018 ||Fy Antenaina Rakotomaharo
|- 
| 2019 ||Heritiana Andriniaina
|}

Women's championship winners
{| class="sortable wikitable"
! Year !! Champion
|-
| 2009 ||Irma Randrianasolo
|-
| 2010 ||Johanne Ramaniraka
|-
| 2011 ||Sabine Ravelomanana
|-
| 2012 ||Sabine Ravelomanana
|-
| 2013 ||Christine Razafindrabiaza
|-
| 2014 ||Faratiana Raharimanana
|-
| 2015 ||Sabine Ravelomanana
|- 
| 2017 ||Sabine Ravelomanana
|- 
| 2018 ||Irina Andriantsiferana, Christine Razafindrabiaza
|- 
| 2019 ||Christine Razafindrabiaza
|}

References

Chess in Madagascar
Chess national championships
Women's chess national championships
Chess
Recurring sporting events established in 1994
Recurring sporting events established in 2009
Chess
Chess
1994 in chess
2009 in chess